Hala Torbyd was an indoor arena in Bydgoszcz, Poland. It was primarily used for basketball and ice hockey and was the home of Polonia Bydgoszcz of the Polish ice hockey league.  The arena held 10,000 spectators and opened in 1959.  Eventually, the Łuczniczka was opened in 2002 to replace the Hala Torbyd.

References

1959 establishments in Poland
1993 disestablishments in Poland
Basketball venues in Poland
Buildings and structures demolished in 1993
Buildings and structures in Bydgoszcz
Defunct indoor arenas
Defunct sports venues in Poland
Demolished buildings and structures in Poland
Indoor ice hockey venues in Poland
Sport in Bydgoszcz
Sports venues completed in 1959
Sports venues in Kuyavian-Pomeranian Voivodeship